is a former Japanese football player.

Club statistics

References

External links

j-league

1979 births
Living people
Shizuoka Sangyo University alumni
Association football people from Toyama Prefecture
Japanese footballers
J2 League players
Japan Football League players
Kataller Toyama players
Association football midfielders